Mark Tansey (born 1949) is an American painter.

Life 
Tansey had an early introduction to art. These early childhood experiences had a profound effect on Tansey's painting style from the inception of his career as an artist. Many of Tansey's paintings are monochromatic and seem old-fashioned. His method involves laying down a layer of monochrome pigment on canvas that can be altered easily only before it dries. This leaves Tansey only about a six-hour window in which to complete his alterations. As such, he works in a style similar to fresco painters, painting in segments that he can finish in this short time frame. Tansey's choice of color and tone lends a specific feeling to each painting.

Tansey lives in a two-story studio in downtown New York City and works there from late afternoon throughout the night almost every day. The first floor of his studio is reserved for final paintings only, while the second floor is where he creates all of the preparatory sketches and variations that inspire his completed works. He derives his inspiration from photographic reproductions and magazine clippings, and works in stages of small sketches and drawings until he is prepared for the final painting.

Education 
From the time he was a young child, Tansey knew that he wanted to continue the family tradition and pursue a future in the art industry. He attended Saturday art classes at the San Francisco Art Institute in his early teen years and made a habit of regularly visiting art museums in the area. Beginning in 1969, Tansey spent three years studying at the Art Center College of Design in Los Angeles. There his works portrayed a deep interest in the appropriation and simulation of media which was a style that did not become popular until the 1980s. His early concern with this technique displays Tansey's deep understanding of art history and the development of art over time.

After graduating, Tansey worked as an assistant at the San Jose State University Gallery. There he became well acquainted with the art that would later influence much of his work. In 1974, Tansey enrolled in the graduate program at Hunter College in New York City. He spent four years studying there, in what was possibly the top graduate art program of the era. There Tansey continued his examination of the historic art introduced to him by his parents, as well as modern painting and sculpture techniques and artists.

Work 
Tansey's paintings normally depict everyday or historical occurrences, though they typically reveal certain oddities under closer scrutinization. He argues that representation has other functions rather than "capturing the real." He argues that his work is about "how different realities interact with each other."

One of Tansey's most potent pieces from this early period is The Last Judgement (1971), which he created from oil on masonite. He was inspired by Michelangelo's fresco in the Sistine Chapel and proceeded to reproduce it in 32 rectangular sections. These were placed on display, arranged four across and eight tall. The entire study was done in shades of grey and brown. For Tansey, this project was "a synthesis of photographic, illustrative, and painterly qualities… The meaning of the work resided in the process of re-translation- reinterpretation reproduction- rather than in its perceptual equivalence to reality." In producing this piece, Tansey "discovered the notion of the 'unlimited brush'- any object able to carry paint could function as a brush… touch was equivalent to light… scraping off the paint let the white ground show through." This technique becomes the basis for many of his later paintings. In this stepwise process, the overwhelming and complex fresco that Tansey saw in the Sistine Chapel was broken down into a methodological and grid-like cacophony of figures.

At first glance, Tansey's distinctive paintings appear to depict straight narrative scenes but closer scrutiny reveals an undercurrent of quirks and visual puns. By thus manipulating the conventions and structures of figurative painting, he creates corollaries for literary, philosophical, and historical concepts in visual allegories about the nature and implications of perception, meaning, and interpretation in art.

His work is in major collections including Modern Art Museum in Fort Worth; Walker Art Center in Minneapolis; Broad Art Foundation in Los Angeles; and Smithsonian American Art Museum in Washington D.C. Solo exhibitions include Kunsthalle Museum in Basel (1990); "Mark Tansey: Art and Source", Seattle Art Museum, in Washington (1990, traveled to Montreal Museum of Fine Arts, Canada, St. Louis Art Museum in Missouri, Walker Art Center, List Visual Art Center, MIT in Cambridge, Massachusetts, and Modern Art Museum of Fort Worth in Texas through 1991); Fisher Landau Center for Art in Long Island City, New York (2005) and Museum Kurhaus Kleve, Germany (2005, traveled to Württembergischer Kunstverein in Stuttgart, Germany).

His 1984 painting Action Painting II hangs in the contemporary art section of the Montreal Museum of Fine Arts.

In the 1970s, influenced by the work of René Magritte's eight methods, he began to search for ways of displaying oppositions and contradictions as the motivation for a painting. From this he decided that illustration and representation were fundamentally necessary to heal the rift between art and practice, between symbol and meaning.

The implication is that he as an artist is searching for a "drive" to incorporate in his subjects, that would engage the viewer intellectually, while avoiding simple visual methods and opting for a more subtle and, consequently, more sophisticated and effective approach. Most of his paintings can readily be used as examples of that approach, where at first glance nothing is out of ordinary, but then it becomes apparent that certain elements are out of context, while remaining coherent visually, thus creating the conflict.

References

External links 
 Artcyclopedia entry
 American Kaleidoscope page
 Brief essay by Amy Scott, amyscott.com
 AskArt entry
 Mark Tansey on Widewalls
 "Mark Tansey: Artist Biography" (& links to other pages), Gagosian Gallery website. 
 "Triumph Over Mastery" (1986), Accession number: 87.4 (no image), Museum of Contemporary Art, Los Angeles website.
 "Profile | Mark Tansey", next-after-this.com, September 16, 2011. 
 Marini, Alexandra, "Mark Tansey", annualartmagazine.com, 2010–11.

1949 births
Living people
20th-century American painters
21st-century American painters
Postmodern artists
Artists from San Jose, California
Painters from California